These are the full results of the athletics competition at the 2002 Central American and Caribbean Games which took place between December 1 and December 6, 2002, at Estadio Jorge "Mágico" González in San Salvador, El Salvador.

Men's results

100 meters

Heat 1 - Wind: 2.5 m/s

Heat 2 - Wind: 2.5 m/s

Heat 3 - Wind: 1.3 m/s

Final – 2 December - Wind: 2.1 m/s

200 meters

Heat 1 - Wind: 1.6 m/s

Heat 2 - Wind: 0.0 m/s

Heat 3 - Wind: 0.4 m/s

Final – 5 December - Wind: -0.4 m/s

400 meters

Heat 1

Heat 2

Heat 3

Final – 2 December

800 meters
Final – 5 December

1500 meters
Final – 2 December

5000 meters
Final – 3 December

10,000 meters
Final – 1 December

Marathon
Final – 6 December

110 meters hurdles
Final – 2 December - Wind: 2.6 m/s

400 meters hurdles
Final – 5 December

3000 meters steeplechase
Final – 6 December

4x100 meters relay

Heat 1

Heat 2

Final – 6 December

4x400 meters relay
Final – 6 December

20 kilometers walk
Final – 1 December

High jump
Final – 6 December

Pole vault
Final – 1 December

Long jump
Final – 5 December

Triple jump
Final – 2 December

Shot put
Final – 6 December

Discus throw
Final – 1 December

Hammer throw
Final – 3 December

Javelin throw
Final – 5 December

Women's results

100 meters

Heat 1 - Wind: 1.3 m/s

Heat 2 - Wind: 1.1 m/s

Final – 2 December - Wind: 2.3 m/s

200 meters

Heat 1 - Wind: 1.1 m/s

Heat 2 - Wind: 0.9 m/s

Final – 5 December - Wind: 0.0 m/s

400 meters

Heat 1

Heat 2

†: Lorena de la Rosa from the  initially qualified for the final (53.85s), but was tested positive for nandrolone and disqualified.

Final – 2 December

800 meters
Final – 5 December

1500 meters
Final – 6 December

5000 meters
Final – 5 December

Marathon
Final – 6 December

100 meters hurdles
Final – 3 December - Wind: 1.1 m/s

400 meters hurdles
Final – 5 December

4x100 meters relay
Final – 6 December

4x400 meters relay
Final – 6 December

20 kilometers walk
Final – 1 December

High jump
Final – 2 December

Pole vault
Final – 3 December

Long jump
Final – 1 December

Triple jump
Final – 6 December

Shot put
Final – 2 December

Discus throw
Final – 6 December

Hammer throw
Final – 2 December

Javelin throw
Final – 3 December

Heptathlon
Final – 6 December

References

Central American and Caribbean Games
2002